Mariano Zuniega Velarde (born August 20, 1939), better known as Brother Mike Velarde, is the founder and "Servant Leader" of a Philippines-based Catholic charismatic movement  called El Shaddai which has estimated following of three to seven million.  He is a famous televangelist in the Philippines.

He is also the owner of Amvel Land Development Corporation, a real estate company, and Delta Broadcasting System.

Personal life
Bro. Mike is married to Avelina "Belen" del Monte  and they have four children: Franklin, Rene, Sherry and Michael. Velarde's son Rene Velarde, representing the Buhay party-list, is the richest party-list congressman with a net worth of P30.9 million. His son, Franklin is an investor in the Puyat controlled Manila Bank (total assets of P7.57 billion).

He son Mariano Michael Velarde Jr. was appointed second in command of the Technical Education and Skills Development Authority in 2019. But now, he serve in the El Shaddai Movement as assistant servant leader.

Theology
Bro. Mike began his involvement with Charismatic Christianity together with the late Russian-Filipino actor-turned-evangelist Ronald Remy who eventually founded the Corpus Christi Community, an Evangelical congregation now known as Lord Jesus Our Redeemer (LJOR) Church. Velarde, having experienced and having been exposed to the Charismatic movement, decided to remain within the Roman Catholic Church. In 1984, he founded the El Shaddai movement  which has become an eclectic expression of Philippine folk Christianity, the Charismatic movement and Roman Catholicism. Velarde remains a layman within the Roman Catholic church.

His preaching style is no different from typical prosperity gospel-driven Pentecostal televangelists. It promises God's financial and physical blessings to all provided that they remain faithful in attendance to gatherings, giving their tithes and offerings, and obedience. Part of Velarde's practical theology is the use of certain inanimate objects such as handkerchiefs, bankbooks and umbrellas which are held aloft during services.  Such practices are not foreign to Filipino indigenous and folk religion. Thus, Velarde's brand of Catholic Charismaticism is highly acceptable to a majority of Filipinos.  Initially, Bro. Mike reports that only "the poorest of the poor" attended El Shaddai's services.

Politics
Bro. Mike over the years has both endorsed political candidates and ran for office himself, such as for the Philippine House of Representatives.

In 2022, he endorsed Bongbong Marcos for the presidential candidacy.

Filmography

Television
El Shaddai (1992–present)
Mga Himala at Gintong Aral ni El Shaddai (1994–1997)

Films
Bro. Mike's Miracles are Forever (2016)

See also
El Shaddai
Prosperity Gospel
Televangelism

References

1939 births
Living people
Filipino television evangelists
Filipino Christian religious leaders
Filipino Roman Catholics
People from Catanduanes